David Vega may refer to:

 David Vega (footballer) (born 1980), Argentine football midfielder playing for Olimpo de Bahía Blanca
 David Vega (gymnast) (born 1998), Spanish trampolinist
 David Vega (1953-2007), guitarist with 1970s funk band Graham Central Station